Motorway 71 (A71) is a motorway in southern Greece. It is a branch of the A7 (Moreas) motorway from Lefktro near Megalopoli, connecting it with Sparti. The motorway was opened on April 18, 2016. It is a toll road.

Interchanges

The exits of the A71 motorway:

References

71
Roads in Peloponnese (region)